Ian Alexandrovich Nepomniachtchi (born 14 July 1990) is a Russian chess grandmaster.

Nepomniachtchi won the 2010 and 2020 Russian Superfinal and the 2010 European Individual titles. He also won the 2016 Tal Memorial and both the 2008 and 2015 Aeroflot Open events. He won the World Team Chess Championship as a member of the  Russian team in Antalya (2013) and Astana (2019). Nepomniachtchi won the 2015 European Team Chess Championship in Reykjavík with the Russian team. In October 2016, Nepomniachtchi was ranked fourth in the world in both rapid chess and blitz chess. He has won two silver medals in the World Rapid Championship and a silver medal at the World Blitz Championship as well as winning the 2008 Ordix Open. 

In December 2019, he qualified for the Candidates Tournament 2020–2021 by finishing second in the FIDE Grand Prix 2019. He won the 2021 FIDE Candidates tournament with a round to spare, which qualified him as the challenger in the  World Chess Championship 2021 for the world championship title but lost his challenge to defending champion Magnus Carlsen. In July 2022, he won the 2022 FIDE Candidates tournament with a round to spare, thereby winning two Candidates tournaments in a row and again qualifying him to play in the World Chess Championship 2023; additionally, he garnered the highest score in any Candidates tournament since the modern format was introduced in 2013. In October 2022, he won a silver medal in FIDE World Fischer Random Chess Championship 2022. Nepomniachtchi is currently No. 2 in classical chess behind Magnus Carlsen.

Career

Early career
Nepomniachtchi learned to play chess at the age of four. His grandfather Boris Iosifovich Nepomniashchy (1929–1998) was a famous teacher and lyricist in Bryansk. Ian's first coaches were his uncle Igor Nepomniashchy, Valentin Evdokimenko, international master Valery Zilberstein and grandmaster Sergei Yanovsky. At the age of five, Ian moved to Bryansk with his first coach, Valentin Evdokimenko, and trained until Ian was thirteen. Under the guidance of his coach, he took part in the World and European Championships. 
Nepomniachtchi won the European Youth Chess Championship three times. In 2000, he won the under-10 category, and in 2001 and 2002, he came first in the U12 championship. In 2002, Nepomniachtchi also won the World Youth Chess Championship in the U12 category, edging out Magnus Carlsen on tiebreak score.

2007–2009
In 2007, he finished second in the C group of the Corus Chess Tournament in Wijk aan Zee earning his first grandmaster (GM) norm. Later that same year, Nepomniachtchi gained his second GM norm at the European Individual Chess Championship in Dresden. The third and final norm required for the GM title was won at the 5th Vanya Somov Memorial – World's Youth Stars tournament in Kirishi. Nepomniachtchi won the latter event, edging out Rauf Mamedov, Parimarjan Negi and Zaven Andriasian on tiebreak score.

By winning the Aeroflot Open in Moscow in February 2008, he qualified for the 2008 Dortmund Sparkassen Chess Meeting. In this tournament, he shared second place after an undefeated run. In the same year, he also won the Ordix Open, a rapid chess tournament in Mainz.

He won the gold medal in chess at the 2009 Maccabiah Games.

2010–2011
In 2010, in Rijeka, Nepomniachtchi won the European Individual Championship with a score of 9/11. Later the same year, in Moscow, he won the Russian Chess Championship, after defeating Sergey Karjakin in a playoff.

In November 2011, Nepomniachtchi tied for 3rd–5th with Vasily Ivanchuk and Sergey Karjakin in the category 22 Tal Memorial in Moscow.

Nepomniachtchi's coach in 2011 was Vladimir Potkin.

2013–2015
In May 2013, Nepomniachtchi tied for 1st–8th with Alexander Moiseenko, Evgeny Romanov, Alexander Beliavsky, Constantin Lupulescu, Francisco Vallejo Pons, Sergei Movsesian, Hrant Melkumyan, Alexey Dreev and Evgeny Alekseev in the European Individual Championship. The following month, Nepomniachtchi finished second to Shakhriyar Mamedyarov in the World Rapid Chess Championship, held in Khanty-Mansiysk. In October 2013, he tied for first with Peter Svidler in the Russian Championship Superfinal, finishing second on tiebreak.

Over the course of 2013, Nepomniachtchi's blitz rating surged from 2689 in January, to 2830 in December.

Nepomniachtchi won the silver medal at the World Blitz Chess Championship of 2014 held in Dubai. In August, at the 5th International Chess Festival “Yaroslav the Wise” in Yaroslavl, he won the Tournament of Champions, a rapid chess event held with the double round-robin format featuring the six European champions of 2009–2014. At the SportAccord World Mind Games, held in December 2014 in Beijing, he won the gold medal in the men's Basque chess tournament.

In April 2015, he won the Aeroflot Open for the second time in his career, edging out Daniil Dubov on tiebreak, having played more games with the black pieces, and earned a spot in the 2015 Dortmund Sparkassen Chess Meeting. Right after the end of the tournament he also won the Aeroflot blitz tournament. Later that year, in September, he won the Moscow Blitz Championship and one month later, he took the silver medal at the World Rapid Chess Championship in Berlin.

2016–2020

Nepomniachtchi won the 7th Hainan Danzhou tournament in July and the Tal Memorial in October.

At the 42nd Chess Olympiad, held in 2016, he won the team bronze medal and an individual silver playing board 4 for Russia.

On 10 December 2017, Ian won a chess game against world champion Magnus Carlsen at the super tournament in London. In the tournament, Nepomniachtchi, the leader after 8 rounds (+3-0=5), lost in a tie-break to Fabiano Caruana, who managed to catch up with the leader in the 9th round, and took 2nd place. On 27 December 2017, he took third place in the World Rapid Chess Championship, which ended in Riyadh.

In July 2018, he won the 46th Dortmund Sparkassen Chess Meeting, scoring 5/7 (+3–0=4) to finish a point ahead of his nearest competitors.

In January 2019, Nepomniachtchi competed in the 81st Tata Steel Masters, placing third with 7½/13 (+4–2=7).

In March 2019, Nepomniachtchi contributed to Russia's World Team Chess Championship.

In late May of the same year, he participated in the Moscow FIDE Grand Prix tournament, which was part of the qualification cycle for the 2020 World Chess Championship. The tournament was a 16-player event. Nepomniachtchi defeated GM Alexander Grischuk in rapid tiebreaks during the finale, winning the tournament. This brought him a total of 9 Grand Prix points, placing him at the top of the scoreboard.

In December 2020, he won the Russian championship with 7.5 points out of eleven matches, edging out GM Sergey Karjakin by half a point.

2021
In April 2021, Nepomniachtchi won the 2020/2021 Candidates tournament with 8.5/14 points (+5-2=7) half a point above second place Maxime Vachier-Lagrave. The Candidates win qualified Nepomniachtchi to challenge Magnus Carlsen in a match for the World Chess Championship in November–December 2021. Carlsen retained his title, winning 7½-3½.

In August 2021 Nepomniachtchi was Russia’s highest-ranked chess player, with a rating of 2792. This placed him fourth in the world and second in Europe (after Magnus Carlsen).

From 26–28 December 2021, Nepomniachtchi participated in the 2021 FIDE World Rapid Championship, where he ended up as one of the joint leaders with 9.5/13 points, and scored second place after tiebreaks. As a result, he qualified for a playoff against Nodirbek Abdusattorov, who also had 9.5/13 points and scored first place after tiebreaks. Nepomniachtchi held Abdusattorov to a draw in their first playoff game, but lost in the second. As a result, he ended up with second place in the event.

In December 2021 Nepomniachtchi played a friendly match with Nornickel president Vladimir Potanin, which ended with victory for the grandmaster in the 38th move.

2022 
Nepomniachtchi qualified for the 2022 Candidates tournament as the World Championship runner-up, and took an early lead in the tournament. He competed under the FIDE flag, following FIDE's suspension of the Russian and Belarusian teams from international competition. In round 13, Nepomniachtchi clinched a victory in the Candidates after securing a draw against Richárd Rapport, going into the 14th and final round with a lead of 1.5 points. This guaranteed him qualification for the World Chess Championship 2023. He is the first player to win the Candidates tournament undefeated since Viswanathan Anand in 2014; additionally, he got the highest score of 9.5/14 in any Candidates tournament since the modern format was introduced in 2013. Nepomniachtchi participated in the World Rapid Chess Championship 2022 and World Blitz Chess Championship 2022 but did not finish in the top three spots of these Championships.

Rapid and blitz rankings 
In addition to his strength in classical time controls, Nepomniachtchi is very skilled at rapid and blitz chess. As of June 2021, Ian ranked 5th on the FIDE rapid list and 10th on the blitz list.

Personal life
Nepomniachtchi is Jewish. He is often referred to by the nickname "Nepo". He graduated from the Russian State Social University.

On 4 October 2021, Nepomniachtchi appeared on the TV intellectual show What? Where? When?.

Together with 43 other Russian elite chess players, Nepomniachtchi signed an open letter to Russian president Vladimir Putin in March 2022, protesting against the 2022 Russian invasion of Ukraine and expressing solidarity with the Ukrainian people.

Video gaming 
In 2006, he was introduced to the video game Defense of the Ancients (Dota), later becoming a semiprofessional Dota 2 player. He was a member of the team that won the  Winter 2011 Dota tournament, and also served as a commentator at the ESL One Hamburg 2018 Dota 2 tournament, using the nickname FrostNova. He also plays Hearthstone and introduced fellow Russian chess grandmaster Peter Svidler to the game. The two of them later provided feedback about the game to the Hearthstone developers.

Books 
 Grandmaster Zenon Franco (2021). Nail It Like Nepo!: Ian Nepomniachtchi’s 30 Best Wins. [Limited Liability Company Elk and Ruby Publishing House]. .
 Grandmaster Dorian Rogozenco (2021). Eight Good Men: The 2020-2021 Candidates Tournament. [Limited Liability Company Elk and Ruby Publishing House]. .
 Cyrus Lakdawala (2021). Nepomniachtchi: Move by Move. [Everyman Chess]. .

See also
 List of Jewish chess players
 List of Russian chess players

References

External links 

 
 
 
  (2007–)
  (1999–2006)
 
 
 Ian Nepomniachtchi  chess games and profile at Chess-DB.com
 Ian Nepomniachtchi  profile at WorldChess.com

1990 births
Living people
Chess grandmasters
European Chess Champions
World Youth Chess Champions
Chess Olympiad competitors
Russian chess players
Jewish chess players
People from Bryansk
Russian Jews
Competitors at the 2009 Maccabiah Games
Maccabiah Games medalists in chess
Maccabiah Games competitors for Russia
Maccabiah Games gold medalists for Russia
Russian State Social University alumni
Russian activists against the 2022 Russian invasion of Ukraine